Standesamt Podanin was a civil registration district (Standesamt) located in Kreis Kolmar, province of Posen of the German Empire (1871–1918) and administered the communities of:

Bud = Budsin; Kol = Kolmar; Pod = Podanin
F = forester; OF = head forester
Accuracy of population data is suspect.

External links 

This article is part of the project Wikipedia:WikiProject Prussian Standesamter. Please refer to the project page, before making changes.

Civil registration offices in the Province of Posen